The Hog Island Cranes, located in Trenton, New Jersey, are two of 28 locomotive steam gantry cranes built in 1917 by the McMyler-Interstate Company of Cleveland, Ohio, for the Hog Island, Philadelphia, shipyard. They helped produce warships during World War I, are representative of an important era of heavy lifting equipment, and played an important role in 20th-century waterfront technology. They were added to the National Register of Historic Places on June 17, 1980, for their significance in commerce, engineering, industry, and transportation.

History and description
The two cranes now in Trenton were sold as government surplus in 1930 to the municipal government for $5,000, a fifth of the original cost, and were installed at the Trenton Marine Terminal in 1932. The cranes had a 15-ton capacity and are mounted on tracks that run  along the Delaware River waterfront at Trenton's southern limits. Only the substructure of the cranes is currently in place.

See also
Hog Island, Philadelphia
National Register of Historic Places listings in Mercer County, New Jersey

References

Industrial buildings and structures on the National Register of Historic Places in New Jersey
National Register of Historic Places in Trenton, New Jersey
Industrial buildings completed in 1917
Buildings and structures in Trenton, New Jersey
New Jersey Register of Historic Places
Individual cranes (machines)